Alexey Alexeyevich Kuznetsov (born 3 April 1981) is a Paralympian athlete from Russia who competes in category F54 throwing events. He participated in the 2008 and 2012 Paralympics and won a silver medal in the javelin throw in 2012.

Personal history
Kuznetsov was born in Saransk in the former Soviet Union in 1981. At the age of five he fell from a fifth floor of a building, resulting in a spinal trauma. He was educated at the International Independent University of Environmental and Political Sciences in Moscow where he studied philology. He is married to his wife, Daria, and they have two sons.

Athletics career
Before turning to athletics Kuznetsov was a world class arm-wrestler, but decided to take up track and field to become a Paralympic champion. He began training in Cheboksary in 2007 and by the following year he was representing Russia at his first Summer Paralympics, Beijing 2008. In China he entered the javelin throw in a mixed points F53-54 category event, finishing sixth overall.

In the build up to the 2012 Summer Paralympics in London, he entered the 2011 IPC Athletics World Championships in Christchurch. Competing in three throwing events, he found success in his favoured javelin, with a distance of 29.44 m giving Kuznetsov his first major international gold medal. The following year he travelled to Stadskanaal to represent Russia at the 2012 IPC Athletics European Championships. He won bronze in the discus and gold in the javelin. Just a few months later Kuznetsov was at his second Paralympics, in London, where he competed in the javelin throw. He led the field until the final round, where his leading throw of 27.87 was beaten by Mexico's Luis Alberto Zepeda Felix, leaving Kuznetsov with the silver medal.

In the build-up to the 2016 Summer Paralympics in Rio, Kuznetsov managed to retain his European title in the javelin throw in both Swansea in 2014 and again in Grosseto in 2016. The world title proved more elusive, with a silver medal in the 2013 World Championships in Lyon and a bronze medal in the 2015 World Championships in Doha.

References

Paralympic athletes of Russia
Athletes (track and field) at the 2008 Summer Paralympics
Athletes (track and field) at the 2012 Summer Paralympics
Athletes (track and field) at the 2020 Summer Paralympics
Paralympic silver medalists for Russia
Living people
1981 births
World record holders in Paralympic athletics
Medalists at the 2012 Summer Paralympics
Medalists at the 2020 Summer Paralympics
Russian male discus throwers
Russian male shot putters
Russian male javelin throwers
Paralympic medalists in athletics (track and field)
Paralympic silver medalists for the Russian Paralympic Committee athletes